Kodigehalli  is a suburb of Bangalore. B.B.M.P. Ward 8. Historic temples and modern constructions lean against and interleave each other here. Kodigehalli is adjacent to Sahakarnagar on its north side. The new airport road to Kodigehalli main road via Kodigehalli circle connects the Kodigehalli area.

To the west of the Kodigehalli railway station is a road that leads to Thindlu. The Kodigehalli bus stop is marked by the Dodda Ganapa Devasthana (a Ganapathi temple). There are frequent buses to the city centre. To the east of ancient Kodigehalli is a new residential layout called Tatanagar, which is also called the I.I.Sc layout. This is because the layout was made by current and former employees of I.I.Sc. In this place Aadhar headquarter is located.  To the east of Tatanagar is the area Bhadrappa Layout, on the outer ring road. On the road from Kodigehalli to Tatanagar, there is an Omkareswara temple and a Ganga temple.

History 

Bengaluru was first mentioned in records from the Ganga era as a small hamlet, the location of which coincides with modern Halebengaluru near Kodigehalli (not far from Hebbal). It is said that when Kempe Gowda built his new capital town in about 1537, he called it Bengaluru as his mother and wife belonged to the hamlet of Halé Bengaluru (Old Bangalore). Stone Age weapons from 2000 to 1000 B.C. have been found near Jalahalli, Siddapur, and Gavipura. Jalahalli is very near the Kodigehalli area.  The Directorate of Census Operations completed its decadal Census recently. During the Census, the department discovered that Bangalore had human habitation as early as 4,000 B.C (Middle Stone Age), and stone implements were found at Jalahalli, Sudasandra, Siddhapura, and Jadigenahalli belonging to this period. Around 1,000 B.C (Iron Age), burial grounds were established at Koramangala and Chikkajala on the outskirts of Bangalore. In 27 B.C., coins of the Roman emperors Augustus, Tyberious, and Cladius were found at Yeshwantpur and HAL, which indicated the signs of civilisation and Bangalore's trans-oceanic contacts. Kodigehalli is so called because it was a gift from the king, Veera Ballala to a resident of that area, an old lady who fed him.

Gallery

See also 
 Thindlu
 Vidyaranyapura
 Hebbal
 Sahakara Nagar

References

Neighbourhoods in Bangalore